Geoffroyus is a genus of parrot in the family Psittaculidae. The four species are found in and around New Guinea, the Solomon Islands, northern Australia and the islands of Indonesia. 
It contains the following species:
 Red-cheeked parrot (Geoffroyus geoffroyi)
 Blue-collared parrot (Geoffroyus simplex)
 Song parrot (Geoffroyus heteroclitus)
 Rennell parrot (Geoffroyus hyacinthinus)
 

 
Bird genera
Psittaculini
Taxa named by Charles Lucien Bonaparte
Taxonomy articles created by Polbot